is an illustrator and former member of the Japanese idol girl group SKE48. She is a former member and leader of SKE48's Team KII.

Career 
Furukawa passed SKE48's 2nd generation auditions in March 2009. Her debut was in April 2009. Her first SKE48 Senbatsu was for the single 1! 2! 3! 4! Yoroshiku!.

In the 2012 general elections, Furukawa placed 30th with 11,179 votes. In 2013, she improved her rank to 27th with 24,990 votes.

In February 2014, during the AKB48 Group Shuffle, it was announced she would be appointed the leader of Team KII. In the 2014 general elections, her rank dropped to 37th with 19,315 votes. On February 1, 2015, Furukawa announced her graduation. She graduated on March 31, 2015. She now works as a freelance illustrator.

On April 20, 2016, she released a manga entitled Chibi Airin Would Like To Speak About..., featuring her character Chibi Airin.

Discography

SKE48 singles

AKB48 singles

Appearances

Stage units
SKE48 KII 1st Stage 
 "
 "
 "
 "
SKE48 Team KII 2nd Stage 
 
SKE48 Team KII 3rd Stage 
 
SKE48 Team KII 4th Stage 
 
SKE48 Team KII 3rd Stage  (Revival)

External links
 SKE48 Official Profile
 Official Blog 
 Airi Furukawa on Google+

References

1989 births
Living people
Japanese idols
Japanese women pop singers
Musicians from Aichi Prefecture
SKE48 members